Martin Clark may refer to:

Martin Clark (author) (born 1959), American judge and author
Martin Clark (footballer, born 1968), former Scottish footballer
Martin Clark (footballer, born 1970), former English footballer
Martin Clark (snooker player) (born 1968), former English professional snooker player
Martin Clark (historian) (1938–2017), British historian

See also 
Martin Clarke (born 1987), Gaelic and Australian rules footballer
Marty Clarke (basketball) (born 1967), Australian basketball player and coach
Clark (surname)